Kavi Kumar Azad was an Indian actor best known for his portrayal of Hansraj Hathi in an Indian sitcom Taarak Mehta Ka Ooltah Chashmah. He died on 9 July 2018 following heart attack.

Biography
Kavi Kumar Azad was born in Sasaram, Bihar, India as Harpal but later changed his name to his pen name as Kavi Kumar Azaad. He was interested in acting and writing. 

After completing his studies, he went to Mumbai to try his luck in films. Early in his career, he worked in several short films and played supporting roles in some films. He was seen in the Movie, Jodhaa Akbar  as a wheat seller. He acted in the 2001-2003 DD national TV superhero show Junior G as a funny police inspector. He gained popularity from the show Taarak Mehta Ka Ooltah Chashmah, which was started in July 2008. He played the role of Dr. Hansraj Hathi, a resident of Gokuldham Society, hailing from Bihar. He died on 9 July 2018 in Mumbai due to cardiac arrest. His funeral was held in Mira Road, Mumbai.

Television

References

External links

1972 births
2018 deaths
Indian male television actors
Male actors from Mumbai
21st-century Indian male actors
People from Bihar
People from Sasaram